The 2017–18 División de Honor Juvenil de Fútbol season is the 32nd since its establishment. The regular season begins on 3 September 2017 and ends on 8 April 2018.

Competition format
The champion of each group and the best runner-up will play in the 2018 Copa de Campeones and the Copa del Rey.
The other six runners-up and the two best third-placed teams qualify for the Copa del Rey.
In each group, at least four teams (thirteenth placed on down) will be relegated to Liga Nacional.
The champion of the Copa de Campeones will get a place for the 2018–19 UEFA Youth League.

League tables

Group I

Group II

Group III

Group IV

Group V

Group VI

Group VII

Ranking of second-placed teams
The best runner-up will qualify for the Copa de Campeones.

The seven best runners-up are determined by the following parameters, in this order:
 Highest number of points
 Goal difference
 Highest number of goals scored

Ranking of third-placed teams
The two best third-placed will qualify for the Copa del Rey.

The seven best third-placed are determined by the following parameters, in this order:
 Highest number of points
 Goal difference
 Highest number of goals scored

Copa de Campeones
The seven group champions and the best runner-up were qualified to this competition whose winner will play the 2018–19 UEFA Youth League. The draw was held in Ciudad Real on 10 April 2018.

The quarterfinals and semifinals will be played in Ciudad Real and Puertollano, while the final at Estadio Rey Juan Carlos I, in Ciudad Real.

Quarter-finals

Semifinals

Final

See also
2018 Copa del Rey Juvenil

References

External links
Royal Spanish Football Federation

División de Honor Juvenil de Fútbol seasons
Juvenil